Brogan William Roback (born August 29, 1994) is a former American football quarterback. He played college football at Eastern Michigan.

College career
Roback played college football at Eastern Michigan, where he saw action in 46 games with 745 completions for 8,653 yards and 57 touchdowns. Roback also saw action as a punter at Eastern Michigan.

Professional career

Cleveland Browns
Roback signed with the Cleveland Browns as an undrafted free agent on May 14, 2018. He was released on August 31, 2018.
He was featured on HBO's Hard Knocks during his time with the Browns.

Pittsburgh Steelers
Roback signed a reserve/future contract with the Pittsburgh Steelers on January 3, 2019. He was waived on May 13, 2019.

St. Louis BattleHawks
Roback was drafted in the second round of Phase 1 of the 2020 XFL Draft by the St. Louis BattleHawks. He was waived on January 27, 2020.

Dallas Renegades 
On February 11, 2020, Roback was signed by the Dallas Renegades. He was waived on February 19. He was added to the XFL's Team 9 practice squad, and re-signed with the Renegades on February 24. He had his contract terminated when the league suspended operations on April 10, 2020.

References

1994 births
Living people
Eastern Michigan Eagles football players
People from Maumee, Ohio
Players of American football from Ohio
American football quarterbacks
Cleveland Browns players
Pittsburgh Steelers players
St. Louis BattleHawks players
Dallas Renegades players
Team 9 players